San Clemente is one of eleven parishes (administrative divisions) in the municipality of Ibias, within the province and autonomous community of Asturias, in northern Spain.

Villages and hamlets
 Alguerdo 
 Busante 
 Omente (Oumente)
 San Clemente 
 Santa Comba (Santacomba) 
 La Sierra (A Serra)

References

Parishes in Ibias